Gabonese may refer to:
 Something of, from, or related to the country of Gabon
 A citizen of Gabon, see demographics of Gabon
 A person from Gabon, or of Gabonese descent; see ethnic groups in Gabon
Gabonese cuisine
Gabonese culture

See also 
Languages of Gabon

Language and nationality disambiguation pages